Awulbodale is a village in Sri Lanka,Asia about  north-east of Colombo, the country's capital town.It is located within Central Province. Geographical coordinates: 7° 19' 0" North, 80° 28' 0" East

See also
List of towns in Central Province, Sri Lanka

External links

Populated places in Kandy District